Raydon Levingston (born 17 January 1946) is an Australian cricketer. He played in one first-class match for Queensland in 1971/72.

See also
 List of Queensland first-class cricketers

References

External links
 

1946 births
Living people
Australian cricketers
Queensland cricketers
Cricketers from Toowoomba